Jean-François Revel (born Jean-François Ricard;  19 January 192430 April 2006) was a French  philosopher, journalist, and author.  A prominent public intellectual, Revel was a socialist in his youth but later became a prominent European proponent of classical liberalism and free market economics.  He was a member of the Académie française after June 1998.  He is best known for his book Without Marx or Jesus: The New American Revolution Has Begun, published in French in 1970.

Early life and education
Jean-François Ricard was born in Marseille in 1924 into a prosperous middle-class family.  During the German occupation of France in World War II, the adolescent Ricard participated in the French Resistance.  He would later note that his reaction against the disgraceful, officious manner of French collaborators had an impact on his approach to writing. Ricard began to use "Revel" as a literary pseudonym, eventually adopting it as his legal surname.

Revel moved to Lyon to prepare at the Lycée du Parc for the competitive entrance examination to the École normale supérieure (ENS), where he was admitted in 1943.  At the ENS, Revel studied philosophy and in 1956 passed the rigorous agrégation that qualified him to teach the subject in French public secondary schools.

Career

Revel began his career teaching philosophy in French Algeria and in French secondary schools in Italy and Mexico, before settling in Lille. He quit teaching in 1963 and embarked on his career a journalist, author, and public intellectual.  Among other positions in the press, he was chief literary editor for France Observateur and later for L'Express.

A socialist until the late 1960s, Revel was a speechwriter for socialist politician François Mitterrand.  Revel ran as a socialist candidate in the parliamentary elections of 1967, which he lost. Later, however, Revel became known, particularly in the context of the Cold War, as a champion of classical liberal values such as liberty and democracy at a time when many pre-eminent European intellectuals praised Communism or Maoism.  The publication of his 1970 book, Without Marx or Jesus: The New American Revolution Has Begun signalled the transition of his views to liberal "philosopher of freedom in the tradition of Raymond Aron." In 1973, he was one of the signers of the Humanist Manifesto II.

In 1975, he delivered the Huizinga Lecture in Leiden, Netherlands, under the title La tentation totalitaire.  In 1986, Revel he received an honorary doctorate degree from the Universidad Francisco Marroquín, in Guatemala, for his commitment to individual freedom.  From 1998 to 2006, he was president of the Institut d'Histoire Sociale. His successor is Emmanuel Le Roy Ladurie.

A year after the September 11 attacks of 2001, Revel published Anti-Americanism, a book in which he criticized anti-Americanism and Europeans who argued that the United States had brought the terrorist attacks upon itself by misguided foreign policies: "Obsessed by their hatred and floundering in illogicality, these dupes forget that the United States, acting in its own self-interest, is also acting in the interest of us Europeans and in the interests of many other countries which are threatened, or have already been subverted and ruined, by terrorism."

Personal life
He is survived by his second wife, Claude Sarraute, a journalist, and has three sons from two marriages. His first marriage to painter Yahne le Toumelin ended in divorce.

One of his sons, Matthieu Ricard, is a well-known Buddhist monk who studied molecular biology at the Pasteur Institute before converting to Tibetan Buddhism. Father and son jointly authored a book Le moine et le philosophe (The Monk and the Philosopher) about the son's conversion and Buddhism.  Another son, Nicolas Revel, is a high-ranking functionary in the French civil service, and as of 2020 the director of the cabinet of the Prime Minister of France.

Thought 
Belgian-Australian essayist and sinologist Simon Leys notes that "...what strikingly set [Revel] apart from most other intellectuals of his generation was his genuinely cosmopolitan outlook", as "on international affairs, on literature, art and ideas, he had universal perspectives that broke completely from the suffocating provincialism of the contemporary Parisian elites."

Of Revel's political thought, Clive James wrote that while he was "always characterized by the bien pensant left as a die-hard right-winger", he was "in fact a liberal democrat who was genuinely concerned that doctrinaire gauchiste measures would leave the underprivileged less privileged than ever."

Reception 
In his book Cultural Amnesia, Clive James writes that "no political commentator anywhere is so consistently entertaining on such a high level", arguing that Revel writes in a style that is "gratifyingly clear in its structure, memorable for its vivid imagery, and consistently funny".

Legacy 
In 2006, journalist and former editor-in-chief of Lire Pierre Boncenne published Pour Jean-François Revel ("In Defense of Jean-François Revel"), which received the Renaudot Prize for Essays.

In 2018, Jean-François Revel was included by Mario Vargas Llosa in his essay The Call of The Tribe, which explores liberalism and the works of liberal thinkers that influenced Vargas Llosa.

Bibliography
 (awarded Fénéon Prize)

References

Further reading

External links 

Honorary Doctoral Degrees, Universidad Francisco Marroquín
 http://chezrevel.net/
 http://chezrevel.net/cat/english/
 https://web.archive.org/web/20080309063803/http://www.souvarine.fr/institut.php
 http://www.timesonline.co.uk/article/0,,60-2163713,00.html
  L'Académie française

1924 births
2006 deaths
Conservatism in France
Writers from Marseille
École Normale Supérieure alumni
20th-century French journalists
French anti-communists
French Resistance members
20th-century French philosophers
French columnists
Members of the Académie Française
French male non-fiction writers
Prix Fénéon winners
Officiers of the Légion d'honneur
Burials at Montparnasse Cemetery
Commanders of the Order of Isabella the Catholic
Grand Officers of the Order of Prince Henry
20th-century French male writers